Bola Agbaje  (born 1981) is a British-born playwright of Nigerian origin.

Biography
Born in London, Agbaje has spent almost her entire life in England, living in Nigeria between the ages of six and eight. 

Formerly an actress, Agbaje's works explore the African condition both in England and abroad, mainly exploring the assimilation and social dynamics in African communities. Works such as Gone Too Far!, and Belong examine these elements alongside the tensions and conflicts between racial and ethnic identities.

Agbaje's first play Gone Too Far! was produced at the Royal Court Theatre in London, where it won the 2008 Laurence Olivier Award for Outstanding Achievement in an Affiliate Theatre. It was later revived for very brief runs at the Albany Theatre and Hackney Empire.

Agjabe also wrote the plays The Burial and Belong.

In 2018, Agbaje was elected as a Fellow of the Royal Society of Literature (RSL), one of 40 under the age of 40 elected in an RSL initiative designed "to address historical biases".

References

Living people
Laurence Olivier Award winners
Fellows of the Royal Society of Literature
Year of birth missing (living people)
Black British writers